Klubi Sportiv Studenti is an Albanian sports club based in the country's capital Tirana, which represents the University of Tirana. The club consists of various departments including basketball, volleyball shooting and judo. The club is funded by the Ministry of Education and Sport

Departments

References

Studenti
Sport in Tirana
1953 establishments in Albania